Ammopelmatus mescaleroensis, the mescalero Jerusalem cricket, is a species of Jerusalem cricket in the family Stenopelmatidae. It is found in North America.

References

Stenopelmatoidea
Articles created by Qbugbot
Insects described in 1979